Anthony Wheatley (176? - 1838) was an Epsom Derby winning jockey of the 18th century.  He won the 1795 Derby riding Spread Eagle, a horse owned and bred by Sir Frank Standish and trained by Richard Prince.  Wheatley's son Will also became a successful jockey - winning the Derby twice and 2,000 Guineas three times in the early 19th century.

He was active from the 1760s onwards and was mainly found riding at York.

Major wins 
 Great Britain
Epsom Derby - Spread Eagle (1795)

References

Bibliography
 

British jockeys
1838 deaths